The Patriot Rifle Conference (PRC) is a National Collegiate Athletic Association (NCAA) rifle-only conference. The PRC was established in 2013 for schools that sponsor rifle teams, but do not have rifle as a sponsored sport in their primary conferences.

Members

Current members

Champions

PRC Champions
The inaugural PRC Championship was held at Ohio State University on February 8 & 9, 2014. The event is held annually around the first weekend of February, prior to the NCAA Tournament qualifiers.

NCAA Champions
Alaska-Fairbanks (10): 1994, 1999, 2000, 2001, 2002, 2003, 2004, 2006, 2007, 2008
TCU (3): 2010, 2012, 2019
Source:

See also
List of NCAA rifle programs
NCAA Rifle Championship

References

External links